SM City Baguio is the 23rd largest shopping mall in the Philippines.

The mall was formally opened on November 21, 2003. It is also the first SM Supermall which does not use an air-conditioning system upon its completion, other than the SM Mall of Asia, that make use of natural lighting and which does not have air conditioning in common areas. The site of the mall was once occupied by The Historic Pines Hotel until it burned down in 1984.

History

Acquisition of the lot

The lot at Luneta Hill where SM City Baguio stands was formerly occupied by Resort Hotel Corporation's Pines Hotel. DBP earlier foreclosed the property in 1984 after the hotel building was burned down few years earlier. Resort Hotel defaulted in a  loan with businessman Rodolfo Cuenca mortgaging using the Pines Hotel property, the Taal Vista and the Mindanao Hotel in Cagayan de Oro.

Cuenca of Resort Hotel and John Gokongwei of Robinsons Investment Corporation sued the DBP in 1990 in a bid to block the sale of the lot to SM. In 1992, Councilor Frederico Mandapat filed a resolution objecting the sale of the lot, noting the objection of the two companies. The Department of Environment and Natural Resources processed the sale. Mandapat asserted the city's claim over  portion of the lot where a city library was originally put up by the city government. Baguio Representative Bernardo Vergara, however, welcomed in early 1993 the potential construction of a shopping mall and hotel complex by Sy's Shoemart Group.

Launching and dormancy
A project to build an SM Supermall in Baguio was launched as early as 1995 by SM magnate Henry Sy and then President Fidel V. Ramos but such plans remained dormant until April 2001. Sy placed the Baguio plan on hold and focus on making business ventures in Cebu City. However it was reported in 2001, that Sy may be pursuing to build a hotel instead of a shopping mall. Sy's original plan was to build a hotel at the lot which Sy earlier bought, formerly occupied by the Pines Hotel and a separate shopping mall in an open lot owned by the Government Service Insurance System (GSIS). The two facilities would have been connected by a  covered overpass. Sy did not push through its bid to acquire the concerned lot owned by the GSIS.

Construction and Opening

In 2001, construction of the lot commenced despite dispute regarding the status of the lot where SM City Baguio would later stand.

A shopping mall was built on the lot formerly occupied by Pines Hotel instead of a hotel as earlier reported. On November 21, 2003, SM City Baguio was opened to the public.

Facilities
In October 2012, the Department of Foreign Affairs opened the  DFA Co Baguio, the first and only passport office in the Cordillera region at the mall's upper basement level.

Sky Ranch Baguio, which opened of November 8, 2018. Sky Ranch Baguio is located along Rambakan Drive (Beside the External Parking Lot or Exit of SM City Baguio)
North Terrace, which opened of May 20, 2019, located in front of the Mall's Supermarket Entrance.
Carpark Annex, The expansion of the carpark, which has 600+ slots occupying five levels, opened on October 16, 2019. Carpark entrance is located along Governor Pack Road.
Sunset Terraces, The Lower Ground and Upper Ground level of the Sunset Terraces opened of December 14, 2019, while the 2nd level of the Sunset Terraces opened of February 15, 2020.
The Sky Terrace, which is the latest attraction at, SM opened on October 2, 2020. Originally scheduled to open in May 2020, it was postponed because of the COVID-19 pandemic.

SM City Baguio also constructed Skyranch in a  lot beside the mall. It opened on November 8, 2018, with numerous attractions such as a Viking ride, a carousel, and a drop tower.

Architecture and design

The mall was inspired by Cordilleran design, such as the veranda modelled after the Banaue Rice Terraces. Design International, a foreign-based firm served as design consultants, Jose Siao Ling and Associates were the architecture firm behind the mall. New Golden City serves as general contractors while DA Abcede and Associates with SM's own engineering group were also involved in the project. Its atrium is also for natural ventilation and the mall utilizes recycled water. The mall stands on a  lot.

Controversies

Cutting of trees 
About more than 5,000 people had a protest in Session Road to protest against the mall expansion on January 20, 2012, which includes a plan to remove more than 100 pine trees on Luneta Hill. The protest, dubbed “Occupy SM Baguio” was organized against the mall's expansion plan to build a multi-level parking lot and entertainment plaza on the lot where the pine trees are located. 

In April 2012, the mall management's workers has uprooted about 8 trees from the said location to pave the way for the mall's expansion there, protesters said. Workers began the earth-balling of the trees at about 10:00 pm on April 9, according to Baguio residents on Twitter.

Multisectoral groups joined the protest even as to sign a petition to stop the Department of Environment and Natural Resources permit that allows the SM Group to cut or earthball the pine trees went online. There is also an edited picture using a scene from The Lord of the Rings: The Two Towers, with the phrase "We Cut it All For You!", depicting the cutting of the pine trees.

On April 13, 2012, environmental activists "occupied" SM City North EDSA, but they were dispersed violently, with the sound system playing the tune of Bad Meets Evil's song, Lighters featuring Bruno Mars. The environmental political party Kalikasan Partylist condemned the violent dispersal by the mall's security guards which resulted to a protester's cellphone being damaged, with some protesters being partially wounded, and their sound system being damaged.

Protesters held a lightning rally in SM Megamall on the same day. Mall guards attempted to disperse the rally but some of the protesters chanted, "Don't cut the trees!" The rally started as a silent action staged at various points inside the mall area. The protesters were divided into 6 groups and wore T-shirts bearing assigned words so that when they converge, they form a "walking call" like "Leave me alone, I'm pine!" and "Cut your greed, not the trees!". But a group of mall security guards escorted the protesters out of the mall. At least 2 were temporarily held in the mall's security office, and they were eventually released.

The issue of the mall expansion about the earth-balling of Pine Trees led British singer-songwriter Sting to move his Back to Bass Tour scheduled on December 9, 2012, at the Mall of Asia Arena in Pasay to the Smart Araneta Coliseum in Quezon City. Sting had asked for the transfer after receiving a letter-addressed to a certain Alica, said to be his US representative written by Minnesota-based lawyer Cheryl L. Daytec-Yangot, a founding member of the National Union of People's Lawyer (NUPL) in the Philippines and was one of the lead lawyers in two environmental cases filed against SM investment Corp. and SM Prime Holdings due to its plan to cut 182 fully grown trees to expand the mall. In a letter, Yangot stated that an online petition on Facebook is circulating, asking Sting to change his Manila concert venue, because the MOA Arena is owned by the SM group which Project Save 182 had sued because of the mall expansion.

The environmental group Cordillera Global Network (CGN) were able to secure a temporary restraining order for the tree cutting in April 2012 from the Court of Appeals via their petition. The restraining order only lasted until December 2014 when the Court of Appeals dismissed the petition of CGN when it failed to prove that the permits were tainted with irregularity. This positive development led to SM to resume its construction activities with 60 additional trees being cut on January 17, 2015.

The Cordillera Global Network raised their petition to the Supreme Court which granted a temporary restraining order March 24, 2015. The restraining order, however, only covers tree cutting activities and does not include the other phases of the expansion plan. On April 10, 2019, SM has been permanently banned by the Supreme Court from cutting and earth balling of trees at Luneta Hill.

References

Buildings and structures in Baguio
Shopping malls in the Philippines
Shopping malls established in 2003
SM Prime
Tourist attractions in Baguio